Tammam Raad (born 1965) is a Syrian politician, the current Minister of Water Resources.

Education and career

 2004-2005: Director of Homs branch to the Orontes basin, head of Planning and Studies
 2004-2011: Assistant director of Water Resources in Homs Governorate
 2011-2015: Manager of water resources at Homs
 2013: PhD in Civil Engineering, specialized in Engineering and Water Resources Management
 2015-2019: General manager of the General Company for Water and Engineering Studies
 2019-2020: General Director of the Public establishment for Land reclamation

Political career 
He was appointed Minister of Water Resources in the First Hussein Arnous government at its founding in August 2020.

Personal life
He got married with three children.

References 

1965 births
Living people
Syrian ministers of irrigation
Arab Socialist Ba'ath Party – Syria Region politicians
21st-century Syrian politicians